DREAM is an ad hoc location-based routing protocol. DREAM stands for Distance Routing Effect Algorithm for Mobility.

References

 "A distance routing effect algorithm for mobility (DREAM)" in

Network protocols
Ad hoc routing protocols